Rodrigo Bañuelos is an American mathematician and a professor of mathematics at Purdue University in West Lafayette, Indiana.  His research is in probability and its applications to harmonic analysis and spectral theory.

Early life, education, and career
Bañuelos was born in La Masita in the state of Zacatecas, Mexico. When he was 15, Bañuelos, his mother, grandmother, and six siblings moved to Pasadena, California. In 1978, Bañuelos received a B.A. in mathematics from the University of California, Santa Cruz. In 1980, he received a M.A.T. in mathematics with a California High School Teaching Credential form the University of California, Davis.  In 1984, Bañuelos was awarded a Ph.D. in mathematics by the University of California, Los Angeles. He wrote his dissertation "Martingale Transforms, Related Singular Integrals, and AP-Weights" under the supervision of Richard Timothy Durrett.

According to MathSciNet, Bañuelos has authored or co-authored 102 articles in mathematical journals and books, which appeared in various journals. 

Bañuelos has served on several editorial boards, including the Annals of Probability, Transactions of the AMS, Probability and Mathematical Statistics, Revista Matemática Iberoamericana, Latin American Journal of Probability and Mathematical Statistics, Potential Analysis, Annals of Probability and the Latin American Journal of Probability and Mathematical Statistics. He has served on numerous committees of the AMS.

Book
Rodrigo Bañuelos and Charles N. Moore, Probabilistic Behavior of Harmonic Functions,  Birkhäuser, 1999, .

Honors and awards
 1984–1986 Bantrell Research Fellow at California Institute of Technology
 1986–1989 National Science Foundation (NSF) Postdoctoral Fellow at University of Illinois at Urbana-Champaign and Purdue University
 1989–1994 NSF Presidential Young Investigator
 2000  Elected Fellow of the Institute of Mathematical Statistics
 2004  Blackwell-Tapia Prize in Mathematics
 2009  Outstanding Latino Award, Purdue Latino Faculty and Staff Association
 2013  Elected Fellow of the American Mathematical Society
 2017  Elected Fellow of the Association for Women in Mathematics in the inaugural class
 2018  Martin Luther King Jr. Dreamer Award, Purdue University
2022 AMS Award for Distinguished Public Service

References

External links
 
 Rodrigo Bañuelos' Author profile on MathSciNet
 

Purdue University faculty
Fellows of the American Mathematical Society
Fellows of the Association for Women in Mathematics
Year of birth missing (living people)
Living people
20th-century American mathematicians
21st-century American mathematicians
Fellows of the Institute of Mathematical Statistics